Lionel William Wiglesworth (February 13, 1865 – June 7, 1901) was an ornithologist who studied birds of Southeast Asia and Polynesia. Wiglesworth published The Birds of Celebes and the Neighboring Islands in 1898 with Adolf Bernhard Meyer.  Together, they described several new bird species, including the dark-eared myza (Myza celebensis) and the Banggai fruit dove (Ptilinopus subgularis).

References 

Australian ornithologists
1865 births
1901 deaths